André Adelheim (27 January 1906 – 27 September 1951) was a French hurdler. He competed in the 400 m event at the 1928 and 1932 Summer Olympics, but failed to reach the finals.

References

External links
 

1906 births
1952 deaths
French male hurdlers
Athletes (track and field) at the 1928 Summer Olympics
Athletes (track and field) at the 1932 Summer Olympics
Olympic athletes of France
20th-century French people